This is a list of members of the Australian Senate from 1968 to 1971. Half of its members were elected at the 5 December 1964 half Senate election and had terms due to finish on 30 June 1971; the other half were elected at 25 November 1967 half Senate election and had terms due to finish on 30 June 1974. The process for filling casual vacancies was complex. While senators were elected for a six-year term, people appointed to a casual vacancy only held office until the earlier of the next election for the House of Representatives or the Senate.

Notes

References

Members of Australian parliaments by term
20th-century Australian politicians
Australian Senate lists